Samyr Laine (born July 17, 1984 in Nyack, New York) is a Haitian-American triple jumper who competed for Haiti at the 2012 Summer Olympics and other international competitions since the 2007 Pan American Games.

Early life
Laine's parents were born in Haiti. He began participating in sports in the 7th grade, where he was relegated to the distance events because of his size. Laine joined the team for the sprints, but ended up running the mile, 2-mile and steeplechase that year. The following year he picked up tennis for three years, even playing for his high school tennis team at Newburgh Free Academy.

During the 2000 Sydney Olympics Laine watched and recorded every athletics event. The Games served as his inspiration and he began to train in anticipation of the 2000–2001 season. He trained and was able to negotiate his way into the 200m/400m group, with some horizontal jumping sprinkled in to help the team with points. He stepped away from the track again to focus on his schooling and debating, having been a member of the debate team since the 8th grade. Laine continued to train and competed at New York's Empire State Games during the summer.

Education and training
During his senior year of high school was when he was able to get a full year of athletics. He made substantial gains that year in what would quickly become his best event, the triple jump, improving from the 42 feet (12.80m) the year before to 45 feet (13.70m) indoors and then 46 feet (14m) outdoors, good enough for 3rd place at the State Championships. After being recruited by nearly all the Ivy League Schools, Laine chose to attend Harvard University. In his freshman year, he was roommates with Mark Zuckerberg.

In his four years at Harvard University his jump improved over 7 feet (2.15m). After two second-place finishes at the conference championships in his freshman year, he placed first in indoors and outdoors for the next two years. In his junior year, although battling with some injuries, he was able to achieve the status of All-American at the NCAA Championships. At that meet, he set what was the Ivy League record at the time and is still the Harvard University triple jump record of 51 feet, 11 1/4 inches and Harvard's outdoor triple jump record of 53 feet, 7 1/2 inches. The following year he struggled with more injuries and was forced to “red shirt” his final outdoor season and watch the team of which he had been voted captain from the sidelines. His injury enabled him to use his final season of collegiate eligibility at the University of Texas at Austin, where he finished his graduate program in 2007. He was able to return to his 2005 form, and achieved the Pan American Games standard. He later graduated from the Georgetown University Law Center in 2010.

Athletic career
It was in 2007 that he first competed under the Haitian flag. Although he was born in the United States, both of his parents and the majority of his extended family had emigrated from Haiti, which allowed him to represent the nation at the Pan American Games in Rio de Janeiro, Brazil and beyond.

Personal bests

Personal life
Laine currently trains and resides in the Washington, D.C. area and speaks fluent French. Laine is working on his Jump for Haiti Foundation, which will focus on mentoring Haitian children and developing more Haitian athletes.

References

External links
 Official site
 

1984 births
Living people
People from Nyack, New York
Athletes (track and field) at the 2012 Summer Olympics
Haitian triple jumpers
American sportspeople of Haitian descent
Athletes (track and field) at the 2007 Pan American Games
Athletes (track and field) at the 2011 Pan American Games
Athletes (track and field) at the 2015 Pan American Games
Olympic athletes of Haiti
Pan American Games competitors for Haiti
Texas Longhorns men's track and field athletes
Harvard Crimson men's track and field athletes
World Athletics Championships athletes for Haiti
Central American and Caribbean Games bronze medalists for Haiti
Competitors at the 2010 Central American and Caribbean Games
Competitors at the 2014 Central American and Caribbean Games
Male triple jumpers
Haitian male athletes
Central American and Caribbean Games medalists in athletics